Archaeopterodactyloidea (meaning "ancient Pterodactyloidea") is an extinct clade of pterodactyloid pterosaurs that lived from the middle Late Jurassic to the latest Early Cretaceous periods (Kimmeridgian to Albian stages) of Africa, Asia, Europe and North America. It was named by Alexander Wilhelm Armin Kellner in 1996 as the group that contains Germanodactylus, Pterodactylus, the Ctenochasmatidae and the Gallodactylidae. In 2003, Kellner defined the clade as a node-based taxon consisting of the last common ancestor of Pterodactylus, Ctenochasma and Gallodactylus and all its descendants. Although phylogenetic analyses that based on David Unwin's 2003 analysis do not recover monophyletic Archaeopterodactyloidea, phylogenetic analyses that based on Kellner's analyses, or the analyses of Brian Andres (2008, 2010, 2018) recover monophyletic Archaeopterodactyloidea at the base of the Pterodactyloidea.

The Antarctic Campanian specimen MN 7801-V was referred to Archaeopterodactyloidea.

Classification
Below is cladogram following a topology recovered by Brian Andres, using the most recent iteration of his data set (Andres, 2021). Andres' analysis found Pterodactylus to be a close relative of the ctenochasmatoids.

In 2017, Steven Vidovic and David Martill recovered a significantly different set of relationships for early pterodactyloids in their own analysis, as shown below.

References

Fossil taxa described in 1996
Pterodactyloids
Tithonian first appearances
Early Cretaceous extinctions